Kurzeme Region, officially Kurzeme Planning Region is one of the five planning regions of Latvia, it is situated in the western part of Latvia, at the shores of the Baltic Sea and Gulf of Riga. The state institution was founded on 2 October 2006, based on the creation of the region territory as prescribed by Regulations No. 133 of the Cabinet of Ministers as of 25 March 2003, the "Regulations on Territories of Planning Regions". As of 2020, the region's population was 237,407.

Organisation 
According to the "Law on Regional Development Kurzeme Planning Region", Kurzeme Region is supervised by the Ministry of Regional Development and Local Government, the decision-making authority is Kurzeme Planning Region Development Council (KPRDC), which consists of 19 deputies appointed by the heads of the region's component municipalities.

Geography 
The territory of the Kurzeme Region was created in 2006 utilising the administrative boundaries of the now defunct districts of Latvia: Dobele, Liepāja, Talsi, Saldus and Ventspils as well as the cities of Liepāja and Ventspils. As of 1 July 2009 the region consist of 17 municipalities and 2 cities within an area of 13,596 km².

Demography 
Kurzeme Region had a population of 240,113 inhabitants in 2019 and a population density of 17.66/km².

Tourism 
The Pedvale Open Air Museum, near Sabile is a national sculpture park.
It preserves the historic landscape, and is a showcase for contemporary sculpture.

See also 
Planning regions of Latvia
Administrative divisions of Latvia

References

External links 
Kurzeme Region website

Subdivisions of Latvia
States and territories established in 2006
2006 establishments in Latvia